Rock Against Bush, Vol. 2 is the second Rock Against Bush compilation album released on the Fat Wreck Chords record label. It contains a collection of songs by various punk rock artists, some of which were previously unreleased. It also includes a bonus DVD with political facts, commentary regarding the U.S. presidential election, 2004, comedy footage, and music videos. It was released on August 10, 2004.

Track listing
 "Favorite Son" - Green Day  – 2:13 *
 "Let Them Eat War" - Bad Religion  – 2:58
 "Unity" - Operation Ivy  – 2:14
 "Necrotism: Decanting the Insalubrious (Cyborg Midnight) Part 7" - The Lawrence Arms  – 1:48 *
 "We Got the Power" - Dropkick Murphys  – 2:45 *
 "Drunken Lullabies" - Flogging Molly  – 3:49
 "Doomsday Breach" - Only Crime  – 2:15
 "Gas Chamber" (Angry Samoans cover)- Foo Fighters  – 0:55 *
 "Status Pools" - Lagwagon  – 2:36 *
 "What You Say" - Sugarcult  – 2:36
 "7 Years Down" - Rancid  – 2:33
 "Off with Your Head" - Sleater-Kinney  – 2:26 *
 "Scream Out" - The Unseen  – 2:48 *
 "Violins" (Lagwagon cover) - Yellowcard  – 3:33 *
 "Like Sprewells on a Wheelchair" - Dillinger Four  – 3:41 *
 "Chesterfield King" (Live) - Jawbreaker  – 4:03 *
 "Born Free" (Live) - The Bouncing Souls  – 1:45 *
 "No Hope" (Live) - Mad Caddies  – 1:41 *
 "Kids Today" (Feat. The Matches & The A.K.A.s)- Dwarves  – 1:25 *
 "Can't Wait to Quit" - Sick of It All  – 2:09 *
 "Comforting Lie" - No Doubt  – 2:52
 "State of Fear" - Useless ID  – 3:12 *
 "I'm Thinking" - Autopilot Off  – 2:50 *
 "My Star" - The (International) Noise Conspiracy  – 2:35 *
 "Time's Up" - Donots  – 3:24 *
 "Kill the Night" - Hot Water Music  – 2:42 *
 "You're Gonna Die" - Thought Riot  – 2:36
 "Fields of Agony" (Acoustic) - No Use for a Name  – 2:45 *

* Previously Unreleased / Rare

Original appearances
The previously released tracks are listed below with the albums on which they originally appeared:
"Let Them Eat War" from the album The Empire Strikes First
"Drunken Lullabies" from the Flogging Molly album of the same name
"Doomsday Breach" from the album To the Nines
"What You Say" from the album Palm Trees and Power Lines
"7 Years Down" from the album Let's Go
"Comforting Lie" from the album Return of Saturn
"You're Gonna Die" from the album Sketches of Undying Will
"Unity" from the album Energy

Political shorts
 "Independent Media In A Time Of War" - Producer: Hudson Mohawk Independent Media Center, Narrator: Amy Goodman

"Part scathing critique, part call to action, 'Independent Media In A Time Of War', argues that dialogue is vital to a healthy democracy."

 "Honor Betrayed" - Director: Stuart Sugg, Executive Producer: Mike Lux

"The 10-minute documentary exposes the hypocrisy of the Bush administration's relationship with the U.S. military."

 "Fixed in Florida"
 "Bush Family Fortunes" - Director: Jonathan Levin, Executive Producer: Matthew Pascarella
 "Uncovered: The Whole Truth About The Iraq War" - Directed and Produced by Robert Greenwald
 "Unprecedented: The 2000 Presidential Election"

"The 2000 Presidential election is the riveting story of the battle for the Presidency in Florida and the undermining of democracy in America."

 "Unconstitutional"

"Unconstitutional is an hour-long documentary detailing the shocking way that civil liberties of American citizens have been infringed upon, curtailed, and rolled back since 9/11 - all in the name of national security."

Music videos
 "We've Had Enough" - Alkaline Trio
 "Los Angeles is Burning" - Bad Religion
 "Drunken Lullabies" - Flogging Molly
 "Idiot Son Of An Arsehole" - NOFX
 "With Love, The Underground" - Thought Riot

Comedy
 "Straight Talk", Will Ferrell
 Greg Proops (footage from "Peter Cook: A Posthumous Tribute")
 "Patton Oswalt vs. Bush"

See also
 Fat Wreck Chords compilations
 Rock Against Bush, Vol. 1

References

Fat Wreck Chords compilation albums
2004 compilation albums
Punk rock compilation albums